Outrage may refer to:

 Outrage (emotion), an emotion
 Tort of outrage, in law, an alternative term for intentional infliction of emotional distress

Books 
 Outrage, a novel by Henry Denker 1982
 Outrage, a play by Itamar Moses 2001
 Outrage: The Five Reasons Why O. J. Simpson Got Away with Murder, a 1996 book by Vincent Bugliosi

Film and television 
 Outrage (1950 film), a B-movie co-written and directed by Ida Lupino
 Outrage (1973 film), a television crime drama film produced for American Broadcasting Company
 Outrage! (1986 film), an American television movie, starring Robert Preston
 Outrage!, also known as ¡Dispara!, a 1993 Spanish revenge tragedy film directed by Carlos Saura
 Outrage (1998 film), an American television film
 Outrage (2009 film), a documentary directed by Kirby Dick
 Outrage: Born in Terror, a 2009 film starring Natasha Lyonne
 Outrage (2010 film), a Japanese yakuza film by Takeshi Kitano
 The Outrage, a 1964 film directed by Martin Ritt, a remake of Akira Kurosawa's Rashomon
 The Outrage (2011 film), a Thai film starring Mario Maurer, also based on Rashomon
 "The Outrage" (Marcus Welby, M.D.), a controversial 1974 episode of the American series Marcus Welby, M.D.

Music
Outrage (band), a Japanese thrash metal band
Outrage (album), a 2011 album by October Rage
Outrage, a 1988 EP by Oi Polloi
"Outrage", a song by Booker T. & the M.G.'s from the 1965 album Soul Dressing
"Outrage", a song by Capital Lights from the 2008 album This Is an Outrage!

Other
 Outrage! (game), a board game
 OutRage!, a UK LGBT-rights direct-action group
 Outrage Entertainment, a video game developer

See also
 Outage (disambiguation)